Central Theatre could refer to

Central Theatre (Chicago), in Chicago, now defunct.
Central Theatre, Jersey City, closed in the 1960s, now defunct.
Central Theatre (New York City), in New York City, now defunct.
Central Theatre (Passaic, New Jersey), now defunct.